Air Music is a set of ten variations for orchestra by the American composer Ned Rorem.  The work was completed in 1974 and was first performed by the Cincinnati Symphony Orchestra on December 5, 1975.  The piece won the 1976 Pulitzer Prize for Music.

Structure
Air Music has a duration of approximately 20 minutes and is cast in ten movements:
All players
All players
Woodwinds, piano and strings
Solo tuba and violin with flutes, oboes, English horn, contrabassoon, and violins 
Three clarinets, three trumpets, snare drum, solo violin and strings pizzicato 
Trombone and cello, with piano, violin, and violas
Flutes and violins
Solo viola with bassoon, four horns, and harp
Two oboes, English horn, violas
All players

Instrumentation
The work is scored for a large orchestra consisting of three flutes (doubling piccolo), three oboes, four clarinets, three bassoons, four horns, three trumpets, three trombones, tuba, percussion, harp, celesta, piano, and strings.

References

Compositions by Ned Rorem
1974 compositions
Compositions for symphony orchestra
Pulitzer Prize for Music-winning works